Kevin Harrington (born 4 September 1959) is an Australian stage, television and film actor and comedian who is perhaps best known for his roles as Kevin Findlay on the Australian drama SeaChange in the 1990s and as David Bishop on the soap opera Neighbours.

Early life
Harrington was born 4 September 1959, in Melbourne, Victoria. He graduated at Caroline Chisholm Catholic College in 1977.

Career
On Neighbours, he first appeared as best man at his father Harold's wedding to Madge in 1988, before becoming a regular in 2003. He was originally chosen partly for his facial resemblance to actor Ian Smith. His character was killed off in 2005 in a plane crash, alongside on-screen wife Liljana and on-screen daughter Selena.

Harrington has appeared in several other television series, including Blue Heelers and SeaChange. He also was a contributing writer for the program All Together Now. More recently, Kevin appeared in "The Western Red Hill" where he played a cop named Barlow. He played Chris Corrigan's brother Derek Corrigan in the Australian miniseries Bastard Boys in 2007. In 2008, he starred in the hit TV show Underbelly as Moran family patriarch Lewis Moran.

Harrington has also appeared in the movies The Dish, Australian Rules, and The Honourable Wally Norman. For the latter, he received a Best Actor nomination at the 2004 Australian Film Institute Awards.

Before getting into television, he worked in theatre and did stand-up comedy. He also provides voice-overs for radio and television advertisements. In particular, Harrington provided a voice-over for a Victorian Government sponsored television advertisement promoting Vocation Education & Training (VET) and Technical and Further Education (TAFE) courses in October 2006.

Harrington appeared as ultramarathon runner Cliff Young in the 2012 ABC1 telemovie Cliffy.

Personal life
He is married and has two daughters, Megan and Kaitlyn. Megan once had a recurring role in Neighbours playing Boyd Hoyland's first girlfriend Heather.

Filmography

References

External links 
 
 David Neighbours Girls and Boys
Kevin Harrington's Inspirational Quotes

Australian male film actors
Australian male soap opera actors
Australian male voice actors
Male actors from Melbourne
1959 births
Living people
20th-century Australian male actors
21st-century Australian male actors